This is a list of novels in the urban fantasy genre.

Youth

Young adult

Adult
Abbreviations used: 
 P.I.: Private Investigator
 PR: paranormal romance
 SciFi: science fiction
 GBLT: gay/lesbian/bisexual/transgender

References

 Popular Urban Fantasy Books, Goodreads
 Amazon.com, Best Urban Fantasy Series, by Jace King (Seattle, WA USA)
 BestFantasyBooks.com, Best Urban Fantasy Books
 All Things Urban Fantasy, Paranormal Picks: The 10 Best Urban Fantasy Series, Posted: November 19, 2012

Urban fantasy
Urban fantasy